The fourth round of the women's individual pursuit of the 2008–2009 UCI Track Cycling World Cup Classics took place in Beijing, China on 16 January 2009. 14 athletes participated in the event.

Competition format
The women's individual pursuit consists of a 3 km time trial race between two riders, starting on opposite sides of the track. If one rider catches the other, the race is over.

The tournament consists of an initial qualifying round.  The top two riders in the qualifying round advance to the gold medal match and the third and fourth riders advance to the bronze medal race.

Schedule
Friday 16 January
11:35-12:25 Qualifying
18:40-18:55 Finals
19:55:-20:00 Victory Ceremony

Schedule from Tissottiming.com

Results

Qualifying

Results from Tissottiming.com.

Finals

Final bronze medal race

Results from Tissottiming.com.

Final gold medal race

Results from Tissottiming.com.

World Cup Standings
General standings after 4 of 5 2008–2009 World Cup races.

Results from Tissottiming.com.

References

2008–09 UCI Track Cycling World Cup Classics
2009 in Chinese sport
UCI Track Cycling World Cup – Women's individual pursuit